An oil embargo is an economic situation wherein entities engage in an embargo to limit the transport of petroleum to or from an area, in order to exact some desired outcome. One commentator states, "[a]n oil embargo is not a common commercial practice; it is a tool of political blackmail, meant to force those at whom it is aimed, into some action they would otherwise not be willing to take".

Notable examples of international oil embargoes include:
Oil embargo (Sino-Japanese War), 1941–1945
1967 Oil Embargo
1973 oil crisis
1979 energy crisis
Embargo against Iran, 2012–2016

References

Embargoes
Petroleum politics